Irek (Russian: Ирек) may refer to
Irek (given name)
Irek, Belebeyevsky District, Republic of Bashkortostan, a village in Russia 
Irek, Chishminsky District, Republic of Bashkortostan, a village in Russia

See also
Irek Ismaren, Star Wars character